This is a list of diplomatic missions of Djibouti, excluding honorary consulates. Foreign relations of Djibouti are handled primarily by the President as the head of state, the Prime Minister as the head of government, and the Minister of Foreign Affairs. Its overseas presence is comparatively small.

Africa

Cairo (Embassy)

Asmara (Embassy)

Addis Ababa (Embassy)
Dire Dawa (Consulate-General)

Nairobi (Embassy)

 Rabat (Embassy)
Dakhla (Consulate-General)

Mogadishu (Embassy)

Hargeisa (Consulate General)

Khartoum (Embassy)

Americas

 Havana (Embassy)

 Washington, D.C. (Embassy)

Asia

Beijing (Embassy)

New Delhi (Embassy)
Mumbai (Consulate-General)

Tokyo (Embassy)

 Kuwait City (Embassy)

Doha (Embassy)

Riyadh (Embassy)
Jeddah (Consulate-General)

 Ankara (Embassy)

Abu Dhabi (Embassy)
Dubai (Consulate-General)

Sana'a (Embassy)

Europe

Brussels (Embassy)

Paris (Embassy)

 Berlin (Embassy)

 Moscow (Embassy)

Geneva (Embassy)

Multilateral organisations

New York (Delegation)

Cairo (Permanent Mission)

Gallery

See also
Foreign relations of Djibouti

References

External links
Ministry of Foreign Affairs

Djibouti
 
Diplomatic missions